Balhae (Korean: 발해; , ,), also rendered as Bohai, was a multi-ethnic kingdom whose land extends to what is today Northeast China, the Korean Peninsula and the Russian Far East. It was established in 698 by Dae Joyeong (Da Zuorong) and originally known as the Kingdom of Jin (Zhen) until 713 when its name was changed to Balhae. 

Balhae's early history involved a rocky relationship with the Tang dynasty that saw military and political conflict, but by the end of the 8th century the relationship had become cordial and friendly. The Tang dynasty would eventually recognize Balhae as the "Prosperous Country of the East". Numerous cultural and political exchanges were made. Balhae was conquered by the Khitan-led Liao dynasty in 926. Balhae survived as a distinct population group for another three centuries in the Liao and Jin dynasties before disappearing under Mongol rule. 

The history surrounding the origin of the state, its ethnic composition, the modern cultural affiliation of the ruling dynasty, the reading of their names, and its borders are the subject of a historiographical dispute between Korea, China and Russia. Historical sources from both China and Korea have described Balhae's founder, Dae Joyeong, as related to the Mohe people and Goguryeo.

Name
Balhae was founded in 698 by Dae Joyeong (Da Zuorong) under the name  (진, Jin), read as tsyinH in Middle Chinese.

In 713, the Tang dynasty bestowed the ruler of Jin with the noble title "Prince of Commandery of Bohai (Balhae)" (渤海郡王). In 762, the Tang formally elevated Balhae to the status of a kingdom. The kingdom's territories did not overlap with the Bohai Commandery. According to Jin Yufu, the Tang referred to the state as Mohe (Malgal, name of the ethnic group) until 713, and "Balhae" was possibly used as a different transcription of the same name. According to the New Book of Tang, the state was called Mohe before it received investiture from China and assumed the name Bohai. Linguists Karl Heinrich Menges and Roy Andrew Miller raised another theory, suggesting that the name Balhae had an underlying native name which was cognate to Manchu butha ("hunting").

The transcriptions Bohai (Chinese pinyin romanization), Po-hai (Chinese Wade–Giles romanization), and Parhae (Korean McCune–Reischauer romanization) are also used in modern academia. Most Western-language scholarship have opted for Bohai except in the field of Korean studies, however some scholars have chosen the Korean romanization to avoid a "Chinese" narrative spread by the usage of pinyin romanization. According to Pamela Kyle Crossley, neither Chinese or Korean transliterations can be correct. She chose to use modern Chinese transliteration "to indicate that the only referent we have is Chinese characters". Jesse D. Sloane chose to use "Parhae" because it was not covered in depth in the state-mandated curriculum of China, but used Chinese romanization for all other terms related to Balhae that appeared in Chinese sources first. Neither Crossley or Sloane meant to depict Balhae as essentially Chinese but used Chinese romanization out of convenience and to acknowledge the transnational origins of Balhae discourse.

History

Origin

In 696, Li Jinzhong (Wushang Khan) of the Khitans along with his brother-in-law Sun Wanrong rebelled against Tang (Wu Zetian's Zhou Dynasty) hegemony, killed an abusive Tang commander, and attacked Hebei. Li died soon after and Sun succeeded him, only to be defeated by the Second Turkic Khaganate. The population of Yingzhou (營州, modern-day Chaoyang, Liaoning) fled eastward toward the Liao River during the turmoil. The Tang tried to appease Dae Jungsang (Da Zhongxiang) and Geolsa Biu (Qisi Biyu), two local leaders, by granting them the titles of Duke of Zhen (Jin) and Duke of Xu (Heo) respectively. Geolsa Biu rejected the offer but was soon defeated by a Tang force led by Li Kaigu, while Dae Jungsang fled with his followers but also died around the same time. Dae Jungsang's son, Dae Joyeong (Da Zuorong), left the Liao River valley for Mt. Tianmen (in modern Jilin Province). There, he dealt a heavy defeat to the Tang forces at the Battle of Tianmenling (Cheonmunnyeong), after which he led his followers to set up a state. In 698, Dae Joyeong declared himself King of Zhen (Jin).

Another account of the events suggests that there was no rebellion at all, and the leader of the Sumo Mohe (Songmal Malgal) rendered assistance to the Tang by suppressing Khitan rebels. As a reward the Tang acknowledged the leader as the local hegemon of a semi-independent state.

In diplomatic communications between Silla and Jin, Silla attempted to confer investiture to Dae Joyeong with the title of a fifth rank official: "Dae Achan". Silla conferred this mid-ranking investiture partially out of a sense of superiority, but also because Balhae was a relatively new kingdom whereas Silla had been centuries old. The people of Jin did not know the system of ranks used in Silla and thus accepted the title. After a while, Dae Joyeong realized the meaning of the title and sought to change Balhae's international status. In 713 or 714, the Tang dynasty recognized Dae Joyeong as the "Prince of Bohai (Balhae)", the name for the sea surrounding Liaodong and Shandong. 

According to Alexander Kim, neither the Tang or Silla recognized Balhae as the successor of Goguryeo. The Tang considered it a dukedom while Silla considered it their vassal. South Korean historians such as Kim Eng Gug, however, believe that the Tang viewed Balhae as Goguryeo's successor. Between 713 and 721, Silla constructed a northern wall to maintain active defences along the border. The Tang later recognized Balhae as a kingdom in 762 but Silla continued to view Balhae as a rebellious vassal. However, Kim Eun Gug argues that thus the "bestowal of a fifth-rank position was an expression of Silla’s confidence, and such an exchange would have been unimaginable if Silla and Parhae were in a hostile relationship." After Tang recognition of Balhae as a kingdom, Balhae diplomatic missions to Japan began to refer to the Balhae ruler as descended from Heaven. Japanese officials criticized these letters, revised them, and limited diplomatic missions from Balhae. A royal epitaph and Buddhist scripture confirm this designation for the ruler of Balhae.

Ethnic identity
The ethnic identity of Balhae's founder is controversial and disputed. Many Chinese, Korean, Russian, and Japanese scholars of Balhae believe its population was composed of Goguryeo remnants and Mohe tribes. Chinese scholars consider that Mohe people form the ethnic majority of Balhae, and arguments for this opinion are also viewed positively in Russia and in the West. While modern Korean scholars usually consider Balhae a Korean state and one of the Northern and Southern States of Korea, Russian and Chinese scholars reject this notion, echoing the position of historical Korean scholars such as Gim Busik, author of the Samguk Sagi.

Some historians view this dispute as the polemics reflecting modern politics rather than historical evidence.

Historical sources give different accounts of Dae Joyeong's ethnicity and background. Among the official dynastic history works, the New Book of Tang refers to Dae Joyeong and his state as Sumo Mohe (related to Jurchens and later Manchus) affiliated with Goguryeo. The Old Book of Tang also states Dae's ethnic background as Mohe but adds that he was "高麗別種" (gaoli biezhong). Literally speaking, biezhong means "separate kind." The term is interpreted as meaning "a branch of the Goguryeo people" by South and North Korean historians, but as "distinct from Goguryeo" by Japanese and Chinese researchers. According to Sloane, Tang sources divided Balhae's population into two categories, Goguryeo and Mohe. The royalty and upper class were composed of Goguryeo remnants while the majority of Balhae's population were Mohe. In a diplomatic mission to Japan in 727 or 728, the Balhae envoy said that Balhae has "recovered the lost land of Goguryeo and inherited the old traditions of Buyeo." Some consider this divide to be a cause of tension that contributed to Balhae's eventual downfall. Chinese scholars have made claims that Han Chinese were a part of the Balhae population, but apart from Goguryeo and Mohe, no other group is associated with the foundation of Balhae in Chinese, Korean, or Japanese sources.

According to Choe Chiwon (b. 857), the people of Balhae were Mohe. In the conflict between the joint Tang-Silla forces against Balhae, Silla described Balhae as "rebellious barbarians." Sillan aristocracy tended to view the Balhae population as consisting of solely Mohe people, but this could be due to the antagonistic relations between the two states causing the Sillan nobility to ignore Goguryeo elements of Balhae ethnic composition. The Ruijū Kokushi, a 9th-century Japanese text, says that when Balhae was founded, it spanned 2,000 li and was filled with villages, each of which were Mohe tribes. Japanese diplomatic communications with Balhae recognized it as a "state of Go[gu]ryeo." In the early 12th century, the Jurchen leader Aguda sent ambassadors to the Liao dynasty to call on the Balhae people there to rebel against the Liao by appealing to a common origin between the Jurchens and Balhae. According to the appeal, both the Jurchens and Balhae people descended from the seven Wuji tribes. However according to Alexander Kim, this only applied to the Mohe portion of Balhae's population and not the Goguryeo people, who were not included in the seven Wuji tribes. The Samguk sagi, written in the 12th century by Gim Busik, did not consider Balhae a Korean state. The Samguk yusa, a 13th-century collection of Korean history and legends, describes Dae as a Sumo Mohe leader. However, it gives another account of Dae being a former Goguryeo general, citing a now-lost Sillan record. Kim considers this unlikely since Goguryeo fell in 668 while Dae died in 719, and young men could not receive the rank of general.

Russian scholars argue that the ethnic composition of Balhae cannot be determined with great precision because no materials exist that can confirm either the Chinese or Korean claims. Some Russian scholars claim Balhae as part of Manchurian history while others believe Balhae was neither a Korean state or Chinese province and there is no direct link between Balhae and either modern China or Korea. E. V. Shakunov believes that Balhae's population also consisted of elements from Central Asia such as Sogdians and Tocharians. Many Uyghurs fled to Balhae after the destruction of the Uyghur Khaganate in 840 but they failed to adapt to Balhae society and caused social unrest.

It is evident that Balhae had a diverse population, including other minorities such as Khitan and Evenk peoples. Archaeological evidence suggests that the Balhae culture was an amalgamation of High Tang Chinese, Korean, and Tungusic cultures.

Expansion and foreign relations
Dae Joyeong died in 719 and was succeeded by his son, Dae Muye (Da Wuyi, r. 719–737). While Muye accepted Tang gifts and title upon his succession, he showed his independence by giving his father a posthumous temple name, Gowang/Gaowang (high king). Muye adopted his own reign title in 720. In 721, the Tang asked Balhae for military support against the Khitans but they refused. To check Balhae's influence, the Tang appointed a chieftain of the Heishui Mohe (Heuksu Malgal) as prefect of Bozhou (in modern Khabarovsk) in 722. In 725, the Andong Protectorate suggested stationing an army in the region. In response, Tang officials dispatched an administration staffed by the leaders of smaller tribes under the command of the Youzhou governor-general. Muye was convinced that the Heishui Mohe and the Tang were plotting to attack him and required a preemptive strike. He ordered his brother, Dae Munye (Da Wenyi), to attack the Heishui Mohe. Munye, who had stayed at the Tang capital as a hostage since the start of peaceful relations in 705, and understood the implications of attacking a Tang ally, was reluctant to carry out the order. He advised Muye to abandon the plan twice.

Muye paid his brother no heed and used his reluctance as pretext to remove Munye from command. Munye fled to the Tang dynasty. A Balhae envoy arrived at the Tang court in 732 requesting the execution of Munye. In response, the Tang secretly sent Munye to Central Asia while informing Muye that his brother had been banished to South China. The reality of events, however, leaked out, enraging Muye. A Balhae naval force led by Jang Mun-hyu (Zhang Wenxiu) attacked Dengzhou on the north shore of the Shandong Peninsula and killed its prefect. Additionally, Dengzhou was the center of maritime trade routes in East Asia, and was the locale where both Silla and Balhae envoys stayed when coming to pay tribute to the Tang Emperor. As a result, Balhae's attack on Dengzhou was not merely motivated by geopolitical retaliation against the Tang but also out a of a desire to assert its newfound maritime prowess as well as prevent the Heishui Mohe from establishing trade relations with the Tang, which would have weakened Balhae's dominace of the northern trade routes. Balhae's successful attack on Dengzhou also demonstrates a surprisingly maritime prowess for a thirty-year old state, which had military naval vessels that could cross the sea as well as merchant vessels that could carry out trade activities.

In response to the attacks, the Tang ordered Gim Chungsin, the nephew of Seongdeok of Silla and courtier in the Tang court, to return to Silla and organize an attack on Balhae. Chungsin excused himself from the request by asking to remain in China as the emperor's bodyguard. In his place, the Tang sent Gim Saran, a low ranking Sillan diplomat, and a Tang eunuch. Munye was also recalled to recruit soldiers in Youzhou. In the meantime, Balhae struck again, sacking the town of Mt. Matou (northwest of modern Shanhaiguan), and killing 10,000 Tang soldiers. The Balhae force raided and pillaged along the Liao River and the coast of the Liaodong Peninsula. In 733, Tang and Sillan forces attempted a joint attack on Balhae but were accosted by a blizzard that blocked all roads and killed half of the 100,000 Tang-Silla army, forcing them to abort the invasion. Muye continued to try to kill his brother. He sent an agent to Luoyang to plot the assassination of his brother. Munye was attacked in broad daylight near the Tianjin Bridge outside the imperial palace but escaped unharmed.

Japanese records indicate that Balhae and Japan enjoyed very amicable relations. When King Mu sent Balhae's first envoy delegation to Japan in 727, the mission was made up of 24 men, which included high-ranking Generals such as 
Ko In ˇui and Ko Ched ˇok. King Mu had 300 sable furs sent by the Balhae delegation to Japan as both a show of goodwill and a desire to foster friendly relations with Japan.

In 734, Silla attacked Balhae with no success. In an effort to curb Balhae's ambitions, the Tang granted Silla's request to place troops in the Paegang region in 735.

The strategic landscape began to turn on Balhae in 734–735, when the Khitan chieftain, Ketuyu, and his Turkic allies were defeated by Tang forces. In addition a force of 5,000 Kumo Xi cavalrymen surrendered to the Tang. The defeat of the Khitans and Turks, and the submission of the Kumo Xi removed the buffer zone that had formed between Balhae and the Tang. Sensing the change in strategic developments, Muye decided to reconcile with the Tang. In 737, Tang sailors and civilians detained in Balhae were repatriated. In 738, an envoy from Balhae requested Tang ritual codes and dynastic histories in a symbolic gesture towards peace. Muye died soon after.

Muye's son and successor, Dae Heummu (Da Qinmao, r. 737–793), continued the course of reconciliation with the Tang. At the same time, trouble with the Tibetan Empire to the west forced the Tang to withdraw all military forces from Korea and adopt a defensive stance. Heummu cemented the geopolitical balance by sending an envoy to the Japanese court, which his father had done as well in 728 to threaten Silla with an ally from the southeast. Balhae kept diplomatic and commercial contacts with Japan until the end of the kingdom. Balhae dispatched envoys to Japan 34 times, while Japan sent envoys to Balhae 13 times. 

Balhae planned a joint attack on Silla with Japan. Gyeongdeok of Silla offended Japan twice. In 753  he treated Japanese ambassadors with arrogance and in 758 when he refused to meet them. After 758, Japan asked Balhae to attack Silla with them. Balhae and Japan exchanged ambassadors several times in the 750s and 760s to plan for the attack. Silla likely knew of these plans and prepared by building six castles along the border with Balhae in 762. The border region changed hands many times but the losses are not described in Silla's official history, only the dates when an army was sent north. Japan prepared a fleet to invade southern Silla, however the plan never came to fruition.

In 755, the An Lushan Rebellion broke out, causing the Tang to lose control of the northeast, and even after the rebellion's end in 763, warlords known as jiedushi controlled the former northeastern part of the Tang empire. In 762, Emperor Daizong of Tang formally recognized Balhae as a state and Heummu as its king. Although China recognized him as a king, Balhae itself referred to him as the son of heaven (emperor) and a king. The consort of the ruler was also called empress. A record in 834 says that Balhae had both kings and great kings. The epitath of Princess Jeonghyo (Zhenxiao), daughter of Heummu, states that his father was a "great king." During Heummu's reign, a trade route with Silla, called "Sillado", was established. The Silla trade route began at the Eastern Capital located at the center of  Balhae's Yongwon Province, came down along the coast past what is modern-day Hamgyong Province. This route, which also passed through Balhae’s Southern Capital, was established for the purpose of conducting trade with Silla. Since the 1980s large numbers of archaeological sites related to Parhae have been excavated in North Korea; among those sites, the fortress at Bukcheong and the monastery site at Omae-ri in the city of Sinpo were locales engaged in the trade between Balhae and Silla. The route led from Pukchong, which was Balhae’s Southern Capital, down along the coast to the Yonghung River; across the river was Silla’s Chonjong (Jeonjeong) Prefecture. King Mun moved the capital of Balhae several times. He also established Shangjing/Sanggyeong, the permanent capital near Lake Jingpo in the south of today's Heilongjiang province around 756; stabilizing and strengthening central rule over various ethnic tribes in his realm, which was expanded temporarily. He also authorized the creation of the Jujagam/Zhouzijian, the national academy, based on the national academy of Tang.

The bilateral relationship between the Tang and Balhae grew friendlier. From 766 to 779, 25 missions from Balhae paid respect to Daizong. By the end of Heummu's reign in 793, princes from Balhae's royal family were serving as guards at the court of Emperor Dezong of Tang of their volition. Peace with the Tang allowed Balhae to further expand its territory. After the death of Heummu, who was posthumously known as Mun of Balhae (Wen, r. 737–793), Balhae experienced a succession crisis. As a result, Balhae lost territory and bordering Mohe tribes rebelled. Both the reigns of Seon of Balhae (Xuan, r. 818–830) and Dae Ijin (Da Yizhen, r. 830–857) saw intrusions by Mohe tribes. Seon annexed the Yuexi Mohe and other tribes along the Amur valley in the north. In 818-820, he also invaded Liaodong and parts of Silla on Balhae's southern border. In 826, Silla mobilized tens of thousands of people to fortify the border with Balhae. In the middle of the 9th century, Balhae completed its local administrative system, which was composed of five capitals, 15 prefectures and 62 counties.

Fall
In 907, Balhae came into conflict with the Khitan Liao dynasty because of the decision of the Khitans near modern Chifeng and Tongliao, who recognized the supremacy of Balhae, to become part of the Liao dynasty. The Liao ruler Abaoji took possession of the Liao River basin, which led to a long conflict. In 911, Silla allied with Balhae against the Khitans. In 924, Balhae attacked the Khitans. The next year, a Balhae general, Sindeok, surrendered to Goryeo. In 925, Silla allied with the Khitans and helped them in their war against Balhae. Afterwards, warriors from Silla were rewarded by the Khitan ruler. In 926, the Khitans laid siege to the Balhae capital Shangjing/Sanggyeong and forced their surrender. In Balhae's place, the Khitans established the autonomous kingdom of Dongdan ruled by the Liao crown prince Yelü Bei. Its independence ended in 929 when a new Liao ruler ordered the relocation of its population. It was soon absorbed into the Liao in 936. The name of Balhae was officially removed in 982. Meanwhile, a series of nobilities and elites led by key figures such as crown prince Dae Gwang-hyeon, were absorbed into Goryeo. Some Balhae aristocrats were forced to move to Liaoyang, but Balhae's eastern territory remained politically independent in Later Balhae, which was later renamed to Jeongan (Ding'an). The Liao invaded Jeongan in 975 but failed to conquer them. In 985–6, the Khitans attacked Jeongan again, this time successfully.

Some scholars considered the eruption of Mount Baekdu in the 930–940s to have dealt a final blow to the surviving forces of Balhae based on records of massive population displacement of Balhae people to the Liaodong peninsula of the Khitan empire and the Korean peninsula of Goryeo. However this theory has lost popularity in Korea in recent times and Russian scholars do not consider it a plausible reason for Balhae's collapse. The most paramount reason seems to have been military confrontation with a superior power, the Khitans. 

The Old Book of Tang stated that the kingdom originally had around 100,000 households and tens of thousands of soldiers, suggesting a population of around 500,000. At the time of its fall, its soldiers numbered "hundreds of thousands" according to the History of Liao. The kingdom's total population in its last years is variously estimated at between 1.5 to 4 million by historians today.

Later history

Goryeo
Though Balhae was lost, a great portion of the royalty and aristocracy fled to Goryeo, including Dae Gwang-hyeon, the last crown prince. They were granted land and the crown prince was given the family name Wang (왕, 王), the royal family name of the Goryeo dynasty, and included in the royal household by Wang Geon, who was crowned as Taejo of Goryeo. Koreans believe Goryeo thus unified the two successor nations of Goguryeo. Some other members of the Balhae royalty took the surname Tae (태, 太).  According to the Goryeosa jeolyo, the Balhae refugees who accompanied the crown prince numbered in the tens of thousands of households. According to Alexander Kim, Goryeo's statistical information shows that more than 100,000 Balhae people moved to Goryeo at different points in time. As descendants of Goguryeo, the Balhae people and the Goryeo dynasts were related. Taejo of Goryeo felt a strong familial kinship with Balhae, calling it his "relative country" and "married country", and protected the Balhae refugees. This was in stark contrast to Later Silla, which had endured a hostile relationship with Balhae. Taejo displayed strong animosity toward the Khitans who had destroyed Balhae. The Liao dynasty sent 30 envoys with 50 camels as a gift in 942, but Taejo exiled the envoys to an island and starved the camels under a bridge, in what is known as the "Manbu Bridge Incident". Taejo proposed to Gaozu of Later Jin that they attack the Khitans in retribution for Balhae, according to the Zizhi Tongjian. Furthermore, in his Ten Injunctions to his descendants, he stated that the Khitans are "savage beasts" and should be guarded against. Khitan conquest of Balhae resulted in Goryeo's prolonged hostility towards the Khitan Empire.

Exodus en masse on part from the Balhae refugees would continue on at least until the early 12th century during the reign of King Yejong, according to Korean scholars. Due to this constant massive influx of Balhae refugees, the Goguryeo population is speculated to have become dominant in proportion compared to their Silla and Baekje counterparts that have experienced devastating war and political strife since the advent of the Later Three Kingdoms. Later Baekje fared only little better than Later Silla before its fall in 936. Meanwhile, of the three capitals of Goryeo, two were Kaesong and Pyeongyang which were initially populated by Goguryeoic settlers from the Paeseo Region (패서, 浿西) and Balhae. 

Crossley believes that according to Goryeo records, Balhae refugees only arrived in groups of a few hundred to a few thousand. She suggests that the total number could not be more than 100,000, while millions remained in Liao-controlled territories. According to Crossley, it is also unclear whether they stayed, went back to Balhae, or moved on elsewhere like China or Japan. According to Kim, between the 10th and 11th centuries, 30,000 Balhae families (more than 100,000 people) immigrated to Goryeo, 94,000 local families (470,000 inhabitants) were deported by the Liao, and only 20,000 Balhae families lived in the former territories of Balhae, a significantly smaller figure than those that immigrated to Goryeo. Korean historians generally estimate that approximately 100,000 to 200,000 fled from Balhae to Goryeo. Historian Professor Park Jong-gi estimated that 120,600 people fled from Balhae to Goryeo, and by themselves comprised approximately 6.3% of early Goryeo's roughly 2 million inhabitants.

According to Kim, many Balhae refugees fled to Goryeo due to pro-Balhae policies during the mid 9th century. In the first few decades after Balhae's fall, Balhae refugees were welcomed by Goryeo. However, it seems few Balhae refugees retained high positions in Goryeo as service in the Khitan administration offered more benefits. Goryeo annals contain only six names of high-ranking officials who were of Balhae origin. In 1029-1030, the Khitan Administration was rocked by a rebellion by Balhae people after the government tried raising taxes on them. The leader of the rebellion was the Liao general Da Yanlin, a 7th generation descendant of the founder of Balhae. He arrested and killed Khitan leaders and proclaimed the establishment of a new dynasty, Xing Liao. He sent an ambassador to Goryeo requesting military support. Goryeo sent some military troops against the Liao but the Khitans repelled them and expelled the Goryeo army. Some of Goryeo's officers sought further confrontation with the Liao, but the Goryeo diplomatic corps and nobility asked the Goryeo king to exercise caution. The Goryeo king decided to abandon military activities against the Liao. Despite this, Balhae people continued to send missions to Goryeo requesting assistance. The last mission, led by Lee Kwang Rok, arrived after the destruction of the state, and Kim considers this group as refugees, not members of an ambassadorial mission. Kim believes that in the 11th century, Balhae people under the Liao started viewing Goryeo as a hostile state in which the Balhae people lacked support.

Liao dynasty
The Balhae people played a pivotal role in the politics, literature, and society of northern China under the Liao and Jin dynasties. After the dissolution of Balhae by the Khitan empire, the term "Bohai" was used through the fourteenth century to denote a subset of the populations of the Liao, Jin, and Mongol empires. The Liao Eastern Capital (Dongjing, modern-day Liaoyang, Liaoning) served as a base for monitoring the former Balhae territories. The city's residents, over 40,000 in early tenth century, were primarily Balhae, according to a figure cited by Pamela Crossley. Dae Inseon (Da Yinzhuan), the last Balhae king, and other members of the former royal lineage still held considerable authority in Dongdan and the Eastern Capital after Balhae's fall. Some Balhae elites, on the other hand, were integrated into the Liao aristocracy and often changed their personal identities dramatically.

According to Wittfogel and Feng, an undated Liao census puts the number of Balhae households in Liaoyang at around 100,000, which would be around half a million individuals.

In the summer of 1029, a distant descendant of Balhae royalty, Da Yanlin, rebelled at the Eastern Capital. He imprisoned minister Xiao Xiaoxian and his wife, killed the tax commissioners and chief military commander, and declared his own Xing Liao dynasty (興遼國/흥료국). He requested aid from Goryeo, who sent forces against Liao only to be repelled. Further ambassadors were sent by Xing Liao to Goryeo seeking aid but Goryeo refused to help them owing to the advice of nobles and scholars to the Goryeo king. Other Balhae people serving in the Liao military also refused to join Xing Liao. Four groups of ambassadors were sent but the last group remained in Goryeo rather than return. Instead only a handful of Jurchens joined his regime. Many participants of the rebellion probably realized the weakness of the new dynasty and fled to Goryeo before its collapse. A year later, one of Da Yanlin's officers betrayed him and opened the Eastern Capital's gates to the Khitans. His short lived dynasty came to an end. The old Balhae nobility were resettled near the Supreme Capital while others fled to Goryeo. In 1114, Balhae descendants took advantage of the Jurchen-Khitan war and rebelled. They defeated Khitan armies twice before they were destroyed. In 1116 another rebellion occurred at the Eastern Capital when a Balhae officer named Gao Yongchang declared himself emperor of the Yuan dynasty and requested aid from the Jin. Liao troops sent to quash the rebellion were themselves led by those of Balhae descent. The Jin relief troops to Yuan easily repulsed the Liao troops but then turned on the Balhae rebels and killed Gao Yongchang.

The distinction between Balhae and Jurchen rebellions was not always clear to the Liao. In the 1117 epitaph of an officer that died while fighting against Jurchens in 1114, the Balhae and Jurchens were mentioned in connection to each other and placed within a similar category.

Jin dynasty
The Khitans themselves eventually succumbed to the Jurchen people, the descendants of the Mohe, who founded the Jin dynasty. Jurchen proclamations emphasized the common descent of the Balhae and Jurchens from the seven Wuji (勿吉) tribes. The Jin sent two Balhae representatives to recruit "people from their home area" while bearing a message that "The Jurchen and Bohai are originally of the same family; as we rise in arms to smite the wicked, [harm] will not unjustly reach the innocent." The fourth, fifth and seventh emperors of Jin were mothered by Balhae consorts. Nevertheless, the 13th century census of Northern China by the Mongols distinguished Balhae people who belonged to the Khitan Empire from other ethnic groups such as Goryeo, Khitans and Jurchens. 

A Song observer notes that during the Liao era, Balhae people were not employed in the government, as a result they were the first to defect to the Jin. The call for Balhae defectors was met with significant success. Aguda was advised by a Balhae man named Yang Pu who aided him in establishing an imperial court. An 1125 embassy noted that Jin protocol officers included Khitans, Jurchens, as well as Balhae. They all spoke Chinese. A descendant of the Balhae royal family, Da Gao (1086-1153), served in the Jin army and was given command of eight Balhae battalions in the war against the Song dynasty. One Balhae commander, Guo Yaoshi (active 1116–1132) fought in the Liao, Jin, and Song armies at one point or another. The Balhae played a critical role in supporting Emperor Shizong of Jin's accession to the throne.

Families of Balhae descent were able to rise high in the Jin hierarchy, including Zhang Rulin (d. 1190) and Zhang Rubi (d. 1187), who were key advisers of Emperor Shizong, and Li Yin (jinshi 1194, d. 1214), who died fighting against the Mongols. Balhae descendants also participated with success in the Jin imperial examinations. Many Balhae literati-officials such as Gao Kan (d. 1167), Gao Xian (jinshi 1203), Zhang Rulin, Zhang Runeng, Zhang Ruwei (fl. 1150), Zhang Rufang, and Wang Tingyun (1151-1202) were entrusted as arbiters of culture and cultivated taste. Wang Tingyun's family received literary distinctions. His eldest daughter became a Daoist priestess, named Congqing, and was a poet at the imperial court. Intermarriage between Balhae civil elites in the Jin dynasty was common. In 1190, Wang Ji identified two families he encountered in Liaodong as Balhae. Writing after the fall of the Jin dynasty in 1234, Liu Qi identified the military commander Li Ying as a "Bohai man of Liaodong."

There were still limitations on Balhae people in the Jin dynasty. In 1136, the Jurchen official Wanyan Puluhu revoked the pardon of a man when his origin was determined to be Balhae. Policies to restrain and weaken Balhae were increased over time. In 1140, an edict abolished Han Chinese and Balhae hereditary military garrisons but not Kumo Xi and Khitan garrisons. The Jin government also targeted the Balhae population for relocation. Over the years, groups of Balhae who were once moved outside to areas near the Liao supreme or central capital regions were resettled east of the Taihang Mountains, which was completed by 1141. Another relocation south of Zhongdu was planned in 1149, but the Balhae court attendant Gao Shouxing protested to Empress Daoping, who told the emperor, resulting in the beating and death of the two officials planning the relocation. A substantial Jin military presence was bought to Liaodong in which as many as thirty Jurchen meng'an units (meng'an literally means one thousand or units composed of one thousand soldiers) and the families of the retinues were moved to garrisons in the Eastern Capital Circuit. The southward migration of Jurchens, especially Jurchen aristocrats, may have contributed to a decline of people who identified as Balhae. In 1177, a decree was passed to abolish the "old Bohai custom" of marriage through mock abduction. Although the Balhae experienced less restrictions under the Jin, there was also less emphasis on Balhae as a distinct group. During the later Jin era, the strong association between Balhae and Liaodong declined as Liaodong became dominated by other identities.

As Balhae descendants became firmly incorporated into the apparatus of the Jurchen-led state, many individual Balhae-descended officials willingly chose to self-identify as Chinese. In 1135, Nansali was chosen as an emissary to Goryeo, for which he changed his name to the Sinitic Wang Zheng. Wang Tingyun also invented a genealogy record on his epitaph tracing his lineage to Taiyuan rather than Liaodong. The epitaph acknowledges that his most recent ancestors were in the employ of Balhae but added that they only "lived dispersed among the eastern barbarians", rejecting his Balhae identity. The practice of inventing fictitious genealogies to hide ancestry outside of the "Central Territories" was widespread from Song times onward.

Mongol Empire
The term "Balhae" became noticeably less prevalent under the rule of the Mongol Empire. There is no trace of Balhae descendants from the defunct Jin dynasty and no epitaphs from the Mongol era claim a Balhae identity. Balhae was only used as a toponym in the early 14th century and Balhae disappeared entirely from historical sources by the late 14th century. Near the end of Mongol rule, Tao Zongyi (c. 1316–1402) put Balhae alongside Khitan and Jurchen under a subcategory within Hanren, which is not surprising given that most of them at the time of the Mongol conquest were literati, officials, or attachments to the Jin bureaucracy. Many chose to use Chinese style names, similar to Jurchens, probably for inclusion in the Hanren (Northern Chinese) category under the Mongol hierarchy, rather than the inferior fourth category, Nanren (Southern Chinese). Aside from legal references to the Taihe Code of the Jin dynasty, the term "Balhae" is absent from the Yuan legal compendium. The referenced passages have to do with limitations on levirate marriage for Han and Balhae and restrictions on marriage during mourning.

Some Balhae adopted Mongol or Tatar culture rather than Chinese. The biography of You Xingge (d. 1227) identifies him as Balhae. As the Jin dynasty was collapsing from the Mongol invasions, You established an independent fort near Gaozhou (modern Chifeng). They fought off several military detachments until they were besieged by Muqali. After You surrendered, Muqali praised him to Genghis Khan, who bestowed on him the Mongol name Halabadu. He later fought for the Mongols at Taiyuan in 1227. You Xingge's son is only referred to by the name Mangqutai, which denotes him as part of the Mangqutai tribe.

The decline of Balhae identity was not a gradual and steady process. According to Toyama Gunji, "the Bohai remained alive and well for three hundred years of history" after the state was destroyed.

Culture
Balhae's population was composed of former Goguryeo people and Tungusic Mohe people in Manchuria. Within sixty sites identified as Balhae settlements, many had dwellings with heating stoves, ceramic roof tiles, and vessels. Iron agricultural implements suggest that sophisticated agriculture was practised in parts of Balhae. These finds indicate that much of the population even outside the capitals were sedentary.

Balhae's culture is as complex as its ethnic makeup. Archaeological findings have demonstrated that Balhae culture contained elements from Mohe, Goguryeo, Turkic, as well as Tang Chinese cultures. However, scholars from Japan, China, Russia and Korea emphasize some components over the others because of their national backgrounds. 

The relationship between Balhae and Goguryeo cultures is debated among historians. According to the Old Book of Tang, the customs of Balhae such as coming of age ceremonies, marriages, funerals and memorial rites, were the same of Goguryeo. Han Ciu-cheol believes that many of Goguryeo's tradition were continued by Balhae, such as the use of Ondol heating systems in Balhae's royal palaces as well as the use of stone lined tombs, stone chambers and stone coffins used by Goguryeo's ruling class. According to Japanese historian Shiratori Kurakichi, 26 of the 85 emissaries dispatched to Japan by Balhae bore the typical Goguryeo surname of Ko (Go), which is still commonly used in Korea, indicating a substantial Goguryeo presence in Balhae culture.

A record of the journey of Hong Hao (1088-1155) in Jin territory describes the Balhae people as primarily martial and not adherent to Confucian norms. Balhae women were described as "fiercely jealous" and prevented the men from deviating from martial fidelity. Balhae men were described as "full of cunning, surpassing other nations in courage, such that there exists a saying 'Three Bohai are a match for a tiger.'" Some Balhae people practiced Buddhism. However Balhae cultural markers evidently did not deviate to the point of preventing assimilation into neighboring societies. There was widespread usage of "Chinese" style surnames in Balhae and no distinct cultural marker prevented them from integrating into Chinese literati society. There is no evidence of any friction in this process. Other cultural markers such as martial traditions may have also facilitated the adoption of Mongol, Tatar, and Jurchen backgrounds.

Society
According to Korean scholars and other historians, Mohe made up the working class which served the Goguryeo ruling class. Some historians believe that ethnic conflicts between the ruling Goguryeos and underclass Mohe weakened the state. Other historians offer dissenting views. Han Ciu-cheol agreed that Mohe people were the majority of Balhae's population but disagreed that they were any different from Goguryeo or Balhae. According to Han, the origins of "Malgal" and "Mulgil" lie in the Goguryeo language, and "the Malgal language and customs were the same as those of Goguryeo and Balhae."

On the other hand, the Russian historian Polutov believes that Goguryeo descendants did not have political dominance, and the ruling system was open to all people equally. Its ruling structure was based on the military leader-priestly management structure of the Mohe tribes and also partly adapted elements from the Chinese system. After the 8th century, Balhae became more centralized, and power was consolidated around the king and the royal family.

The class system of Balhae society is controversial. Some studies suggest there was a stratified and rigid class system similar to those of the related Korean kingdoms and pre-Qin northern China. Elites tended to belong to large extended aristocratic family lines designated by surnames. The commoners in comparison had no surnames at all, and upward social mobility was virtually impossible as class and status were codified into a caste system. Other studies have shown there was a clan system but no clear division of classes existed, whereas the position of the clan leader depended on the strength of the clan. Any member of the clan could become the clan leader if he had sufficient authority. There were also religiously privileged shaman clans. The clan struggles were also partly due to growing Tang influence and different attitudes toward further Sinicization. The main part of society in Balhae was free in a personal capacity and consisted of clans.

By the time of the state’s demise, the Balhae mode of living had come to resemble that of the northern Chinese. The Liao dynasty classified the Balhae population as Han in legal and taxation contexts, the same as those whose ancestry was traced to the Tang empire. Some Mohe groups did not adopt this manner of life and were excluded from the Liao's designation of Balhae. Instead, they remained as Mohe, and would become an important source of the Jurchen people in the future.

Government

After its founding, Balhae actively imported the culture and political system of the Tang dynasty and the Chinese reciprocated through an account of Balhae describing it as the "Flourishing land of the East (海東盛國)." The bureaucracy of Balhae was modeled after the Three Departments and Six Ministries and used literary Chinese as the written language of administration. Balhae's aristocrats and nobility traveled to the Tang capital of Chang'an on a regular basis as ambassadors and students, many of whom went on to pass the imperial examinations. Three students are recorded in 833 and a royal nephew in 924. Although Balhae was a tributary state of the Tang dynasty, it followed its own independent path, not only in its internal policies, but also in its foreign relations. Furthermore, it regarded itself as an empire, and sent ambassadors to neighbor states such as Japan in an independent capacity.

Balhae had five capitals, fifteen provinces, and sixty-three counties. Balhae's original capital was at Dongmo Mountain in modern Dunhua, Jilin Province, China. In 742 it was moved to the Central Capital in Helong, Jilin. It was moved to the Upper Capital in Ning'an, Heilongjiang in 755, to the Eastern Capital in Hunchun, Jilin in 785, and back to the Upper Capital in 794. Sanggyong (Upper Capital) was organized in the way of the Tang capital of Chang'an. Residential sectors were laid out on either side of the palace surrounded by a rectangular wall. The same layout was also implemented by other East Asian capitals of the time.

Military
The 10 units (wi) constituted the central army while two of them, the Left and Right Maengbunwi, were the elite units. Each unit had its own responsibility such as defending the royal palace and the capital or serving as palace guards. For other regions, armed forces were deployed in the 15 local provinces (bu). It is known that in its early years, during the reign of King Mu, Balhae held 100,000 troops.

Language and script

Balhae used multiple languages. The indigenous language of Balhae is unclear, as no extant text or gloss of the language survived.

One term that the people of Balhae used to describe "a king" was Gadokbu, which is related to the words kadalambi (management) of the Manchu language and kadokuotto of the Nanai language.

Alexander Vovin suggests that the Balhae elite spoke a Koreanic language, which has had a lasting impact on Khitan, Jurchen and Manchu languages. However, he also believes that the vast majority of the Balhae population were probably Tungusic, and at least partially Jurchen-speaking. Some Korean historians believe that a record in Shoku Nihongi implies that the Balhae and Silla language were mutually intelligible: a student sent from Silla to Japan for Japanese language interpreter training assisted a diplomatic envoy from Balhae in communicating with the audience of a Japanese court.

Diplomatic missions between Balhae, Japan and the Tang dynasty were primarily conducted in the Chinese language. Based on administrative and diplomatic records, a number of Japanese historians and linguists have further suggested that Chinese was the lingua franca of Balhae. Classical Chinese was also used for the two unearthed tomb inscriptions for members of the Balhae royal family. 

Excavated epigraphic materials indicate that the Chinese script was the only widely used script in Balhae. According to Russian scientific research, the Balhae writing system is based on Chinese characters, and among the characters used, many were used only in the state "Wu". However, the recording was phonetic. Some of the names of Balhae's emissaries were similar to Chinese names while others were unique to Balhae: Wodala, Zhaoheshi, and Nansali. The unique Balhae names were the minority. The Old Book of Tang records that Balhae had its own script, about which almost nothing is known. Vovin has suggested that the script was a prototype of the Jurchen script. While most Balhae inscriptions consisted of common Chinese characters, he has identified a small number of characters with Jurchen script signs or phonograms.

Economy and trade
Under Balhae, the region's agriculture became much more widespread and well-developed than in previous centuries, especially in the north. Millet, barley, soy beans and rice were the main type of crops cultivated in Balhae. Some of its specialized regional produce, such as rice, fermented beans, plums and pears, were much sought after. Fishing and hunting also remained important among Balhae people. Balhae also produced fine iron and copper wares, silk and linen textiles, and ceramics, including Sancai pottery developed under the influence of that of the Tang. Whaling was also done, albeit this was mostly done as tribute to the Tang.

Balhae had a high level of craftsmanship and engaged in trade with neighboring polities such as the Göktürks, Nara Japan, Later Silla and the Tang dynasty. Balhae sent a large number of envoys to Japan, called . Fur from Balhae was exported to Japan while textile products and precious metals, such as gold and mercury, were imported from Japan. In Japan, the fur of the 貂 (ten, i.e. sable or other marten) was very valuable due to its popularity among Japanese aristocrats. Balhae's musical works Shinmaka have been preserved by the Japanese court.

Controversies

The historic position of Balhae is disputed between Korean, Chinese, Russian, and Japanese historians. Korean scholars consider Balhae to be the successor state of Goguryeo, and part of the North–South States Period of Korean history. Chinese scholars argue that Balhae was a local administration of the Tang dynasty and composed of Mohe people, making it a part of Chinese history due to its close cultural and political ties with Tang China. The Russian archaeological school views Balhae as a state of primarily Mohe people while Japanese scholars consider it a tributary state.

Media
Balhae features in the Korean film Shadowless Sword, which is about the last prince of Balhae. The Korean TV drama Dae Jo Yeong, which aired from 16 September 2006, to 23 December 2007, was about the founder of Balhae.

Balhae is the name of the lunar research facility in the Korean TV series, The Silent Sea.

See also
Ancient Tombs at Longtou Mountain
History of Korea
History of Manchuria
History of China
Goguryeo
Goryeo
List of Provinces of Balhae
List of Balhae monarchs

Notes

References

Bibliography

 
  
 孫玉良 (1992). 渤海史料全編. 吉林文史出版社

External links

 Britannica Concise Encyclopedia
 Columbia Encyclopedia
 U.S. Library of Congress: Country Studies
 Metropolitan Museum of Art
 Bohai Kingdom in academia
 
  Bohai country Research Center 渤海国交流研究センター
  Han's Palhae of Korea 한규철의 발해사 연구실
  History of Bohai country Государство Бохай (698-926 гг.)

 
698 establishments
926 disestablishments
Former countries in Korean history
Former countries in Chinese history
Former countries in East Asia
Former monarchies of East Asia
History of Manchuria